Kehewin may refer to:

Kehewin Cree Nation in northern Alberta, Canada
Kehewin 123, their Indian reserve
Keheewin, Edmonton, a neighbourhood in Edmonton, Alberta